"Ching Ching" is the second single by rap artist Ms. Jade. The song is also found on track four of her debut album, Girl Interrupted, released in 2002.

The album version is the clean version, despite Girl Interrupted having a parental advisory sign. There is an explicit version of the song. It can be found on the song's promotional use only vinyl single as "LP" Version. The promotional vinyl single was published before the decision to put the clean version on the album. The reason for putting the clean version on the album is unknown.

"Ching Ching" features  artists Timbaland and Nelly Furtado, and contains a sample of Furtado's song "Baby Girl" from her 2000 debut album, Whoa, Nelly!. The title of "Ching Ching" comes from an improvised nonsensical lyric in "Baby Girl".

The "Ching Ching" music video was shot in Los Angeles, California at night on September 18 and September 19, 2002, and was directed by Marc Klasfeld. The video features Ms. Jade as a woman who is chased in her Hummer by her boyfriend (played by Timbaland) after she catches him with three other women in his Hummer at an intersection. After they leave their respective SUVs, Ms. Jade argues with Timbaland on the street. Furtado joins Jade in the dispute as a crowd gathers, and at the end of the video Ms. Jade takes a handful of cash from Timbaland's pocket and throws it into the air to the delight of the crowd.

Other versions
 "Ching Ching" (Radio Edit) (Clean Version, also serves as Album Version) (3:56) 
 "Ching Ching" (Instrumental Version) (4:35) 
 "Ching Ching" (Alternative Version) (Explicit version) (4:18) 
 "Ching Ching" (Acapella) (Explicit version) 4:39

Charts

References

2002 singles
Music videos directed by Marc Klasfeld
Nelly Furtado songs
Song recordings produced by Timbaland
Timbaland songs
Songs written by Timbaland
Songs written by Nelly Furtado
Songs written by Gerald Eaton
Songs written by Brian West (musician)